Justin Robert Currie (born 11 December 1964) is a Scottish singer and songwriter best known as a founding member of the band Del Amitri.

Career

Del Amitri

Justin Currie was born in Glasgow and established the band Del Amitri in the early 1980s after putting up a sign in a music shop asking for other people who could play instruments to get in contact with him. As well as being the lead singer and chief songwriter of the band, Currie also plays bass with them. Between 1985 and 2002, the band released six studio albums. Their 1995 single "Roll to Me" reached number 10 on the Billboard Hot 100. Five Del Amitri albums have reached the Top 10 in the UK. Globally, Del Amitri have sold six million albums.

The Uncle Devil Show
Justin Currie with Kevin and Jim McDermott released the album "A Terrible Beauty" under the moniker The Uncle Devil Show in 2004.

Solo career
In addition to his career with Del Amitri, Currie is also a solo artist. In 2006 he was a special guest on Tom McRae's Hotel Cafe Tour. In 2005 he wrote and recorded an album with the working title 'Rebound'. It was subsequently re-titled What Is Love For and released on Rykodisc on 8 October 2007. A single/EP from the album, "No, Surrender", was released on 24 March 2008.

Currie's second album The Great War was released on 3 May 2010, a single titled "A Man with Nothing to Do" was released on 26 April 2010.

A third solo album, titled Lower Reaches, recorded in Texas, and was released on 19 August 2013. It is preceded by a free download of the track "Little Stars", plus a track released to radio in July 2013, "Bend to My Will". The album reached number 46 in the UK Albums Chart.

Solo discography
2007: What Is Love For UK #106
2010: The Great War  UK #90
2013: Lower Reaches UK #46
2017: This Is My Kingdom Now UK #54

Family and personal life
Currie’s father John Currie was chorusmaster for the Scottish National Orchestra Chorus from 1965 to 1984 and music director of the Los Angeles Master Chorale from 1986 to 1991.

His cousin is singer-songwriter Nick Currie, the known as "Momus".

References

External links
 Official website
 BUTTON UP featuring Justin Currie (East Grange Loft, Forres, 21 August 2003) HI-Arts, 22 August 2003 - Review of first Button Up concert, 2003
 With Strings Attached - Official Site

1964 births
Living people
Musicians from Glasgow
Scottish singer-songwriters
20th-century Scottish male singers
Scottish bass guitarists
Rykodisc artists
Del Amitri members
Male bass guitarists
Ignition Records artists
21st-century Scottish male singers
British male singer-songwriters